The Bestival 2008 was the fifth instalment of the Bestival a boutique music festival at Robin Hill on the Isle of Wight. The festival was held between 5–7 September 2008 and over 30,000 people attended.

The festival was nominated for Best Medium Sized Festival, Grass Roots Festival Award, Family Festival Award, Best Lineup and Best Toilets in the UK Festival Awards.

2008 marked the return of Bestival Radio. The station broadcast on-site and kept listeners camping at the festival up-to-date on news and events over the weekend. Bestival FM was sponsored by Jokers' Masquerade

The event was marred by heavy rain on the Friday and Saturday causing stage closures and widespread misery for festival-goers. The fancy dress theme was '30,000 freaks under the sea' so most were prepared for the ensuing aquatics.

Line-up: Main Stage

Friday
 My Bloody Valentine
 Pendulum
 Foals
 Jamie Lidell
 The Wedding Present
 Joe Lean and the Jing Jang Jong, Bastila and The Shanklin Freakshow did not appear due to adverse weather

Saturday
 Amy Winehouse
 Hot Chip
 DJ Yoda
 The Human League
 Special Guest: Grace Jones
 Special Guests: The Specials - although they played under the name of Terry Hall and friends due to legal constraints
 The Cuban Brothers
 Gary Numan
 Dan Le Sac Vs Scroobius Pip
 Kitty Daisy & Lewis
 Jeffrey Lewis
 Laura Marling

Sunday
 Underworld
 George Clinton & Funkadelic/Parliament
 Roni Size
 Baaba Maal
 Sebastien Tellier
 Get Cape. Wear Cape. Fly
 King Creosote
 The Fairey Band (Acid Brass)

Line-up: Big Top

Friday
 The Dub Pistols
 Slam
 CSS
 Chromeo
 The Breeders
 Santigold
 Ladyhawke
 Ebony Bones
 Transglobal Underground
 The Hat
 Cazals

Saturday
 808 State
 Aphex Twin
 Hercules & Love Affair
 Lee 'Scratch' Perry
 Sub Focus
 Bailey
 The Count & Sinden
 Slagsmålsklubben
 Red Snapper
 Chas & Dave
 The Human League
 I Am Kloot
 The Qemists

Sunday
 Neon Neon
 Carl Craig
 Coldcut
 Midnight Juggernauts
 The Coral
 Filfthy Dukes
 Ulrich Schnauss
 Grand National
 Emma J Mac

Line-up: other stages 
 BBC Introducing: Cage the Elephant, Will Young, The Bees - a number of artists including Black Kids, Sam Sparro, Lykke Li, The Shortwave Set, Ida Maria, Natty, Noah and the Whale, Hadouken!, Late of the Pier and Pete & The Pirates had been due to play but were cancelled due to flooding of the lower part of the Bestival site
 Red Bull 54 Speakeasy: Alphabeat, Lethal Bizzle, The Sugarhill Gang, DJ Yoda
 Bandstand: Yacht, Sophie Barker, Misty's Big Adventure, Lucky Elephant, MC'd by comedian Scott Anderson

References

External links 

 Bestival Website

Music festivals on the Isle of Wight
2008 in British music
2008 in England